Olalekan Kudus Oyenuga (born 18 March 1993) is an English footballer, who plays as a forward for Southend Manor.

He has played for Tottenham Hotspur, Hayes & Yeading United, Dundee United, Hartlepool United and Greenock Morton. He has also played for MyPa, Bury, St Johnstone, Boreham Wood, Dartford and Cowdenbeath on loan.

He is now manager at Southend Manor having been appointed in December 2022.

Career
Oyenuga was born in Walthamstow and began his football career by joining the Tottenham Hotspur academy in 2008. In April 2011, Oyenuga agreed a two-year deal with Tottenham and then went out on loan to Finnish side MyPa, until the end of August 2011.

On 15 August 2011, he joined Bury on loan for a month, making one appearance, coming on as a substitute, in a 2–1 loss against Charlton on 28 August 2011. Afterwards, he left Bury. In November, Oyenuga went on trial with Southampton after scoring twice in a reserve match in a 4–1 win over Plymouth Argyle, but no move was made.

In the January 2012 transfer window, Oyenuga joined Scottish Premier League side St Johnstone on loan, until the end of the season. On 14 February he made his St Johnstone debut, coming on as a substitute in extra time, in a 2–1 loss against Hearts in a fifth round replay in the Scottish Cup. Two months later, he made his league debut, coming on as a substitute, in a 2–0 loss against Celtic. At the end of the season, Oyenuga returned to Tottenham and was soon released by the club.

In August 2012, Oyenuga joined Hayes & Yeading United He established himself in the first team, making 40 appearances and scoring eighteen in all competitions. In addition, he was the club's top-scorer and helped the club avoid relegation. At the end of the season it was thought that Oyenuga might leave the club. The club then granted permission for him to leave the club.

After leaving Hayes & Yeading United, Kudus returned to Scotland, joining Dundee United on trial, along with former teammate Calum Butcher. After impressing manager Jackie McNamara during their trial, both players subsequently joined the club, Oyenuga signing a three-year contract. On 22 September 2013, he made his Dundee United debut, coming on as a substitute against Motherwell.

In January 2014, Oyenuga joined Boreham Wood on loan until the end of the season. On 25 August 2014, he was loaned out again, this time to Scottish Championship club Cowdenbeath until January 2015, later extended for the rest of the 2014–15 season. On 13 May 2015, he was released by Dundee United.

On 6 July 2015, Oyenuga signed for Hartlepool United on a free transfer, becoming their eighth signing of the summer. He scored his first goal for Hartlepool in a 1–0 FA Cup win against Cheltenham Town on 7 November 2015. A week later he scored his first league goal in a 3–1 win over Leyton Orient.

On 4 May 2016, Oyenuga was named as one of three players released by Hartlepool United, and went on trial at Livingston and then Greenock Morton. After his trial match for Morton, Oyenuga signed a five-month contract with the club. He scored his first goal for Morton in a 1–1 draw with Dumbarton on 20 August 2016. In late December, Oyenuga would sign a contract to keep him at the club until the end of the season. He was released at the end of his contract.

In June 2017, Oyenuga signed for Chelmsford City. On 5 August 2017, Oyenuga scored twice on his debut for the club in a 2–0 win against Gloucester City. In June 2018, Oyenuga signed for Dartford. On 15 February 2019, Oyenuga joined Haringey Borough on an initial month's loan. On 19 June 2019, Oyenuga joined Welling United. Before playing a single game for Welling United, Oyenuga joined Margate. He left the club on 6 January 2020 and joined Leatherhead. In July 2021, Oyenuga signed for Grays Athletic. In November 2021, Oyenuga signed for Coggeshall Town. In March 2022, Oyenuga signed for Basildon United.

In October 2022, Oyenuga was appointed assistant manager at Southend Manor, whilst also holding a playing role at the club. In December 2022, Oyenuga was named as Southend Manor manager alongside Jack Morris.

Career statistics

References

External links
 
 

1993 births
Living people
Footballers from Walthamstow
English footballers
Association football forwards
Veikkausliiga players
Tottenham Hotspur F.C. players
Myllykosken Pallo −47 players
Bury F.C. players
Hartlepool United F.C. players
English Football League players
Black British sportspeople
St Johnstone F.C. players
Hayes & Yeading United F.C. players
Dundee United F.C. players
Cowdenbeath F.C. players
Scottish Professional Football League players
English expatriate footballers
Expatriate footballers in Finland
English people of Nigerian descent
Boreham Wood F.C. players
National League (English football) players
Greenock Morton F.C. players
Chelmsford City F.C. players
Haringey Borough F.C. players
Welling United F.C. players
Dartford F.C. players
Margate F.C. players
Leatherhead F.C. players
Brentwood Town F.C. players
Southend Manor F.C. players
Essex Senior Football League players
English football managers
Southend Manor F.C. managers